Andrzej Mularczyk (born 13 June 1930 in Warsaw) is a Polish writer, screenwriter, reporter, and author of radio dramas.

His brother is the Polish writer Roman Bratny.

He made his literary debut in 1943 in the conspiratorial publication Dźwigary, which published his work (anonymously). After the war, in 1949 he began to work as a journalist at the same time as he was pursuing studies in the Journalism Department of the University of Warsaw. He completed his studies in 1955. He worked as a reporter and columnist for the weekly publication "Świat". He has been a member of the Związek Literatów Polskich since 1955 and of the Stowarzyszenie Filmowców Polskich since 1964.

In 1970-1977 he worked as literary director in the film group Iluzjon, and also worked for Polish Radio for many years.

Many films have been based on his screenplays, including some that are very widely known in Poland such as the series Sami swoi, Nie ma mocnych, Kochaj albo rzuć, and the television serial Dom. He has written a total of around 40 screenplays. He is the author of the film story Post mortem. Katyń, released in 2007, which served as the basis for Andrzej Wajda’s film Katyń about the Katyn massacre.

Under the pseudonym Andrzej Jurek he co-authored the screenplay for the film Liczę na wasze grzechy, together with Jerzy Janicki.

Selected films

Screenplay 
 1958: Miasteczko
 1964: Przerwany lot
 1966: Ktokolwiek wie...
 1967: Sami swoi
 1967: Julia, Anna, Genowefa...
 1971: Jeszcze słychać śpiew i rżenie koni...
 1971: Na przełaj
 1973: Sobie król
 1973: Droga
 1974: Nie ma mocnych
 1974: Cień tamtej wiosny
 1974: Głowy pełne gwiazd
 1975: Niespotykanie spokojny człowiek
 1976: Ostatnie takie trio
 1977: Kochaj albo rzuć
 1978: Rodzina Połanieckich
 1978: Wielki podryw
 1980-2000: Dom
 1982: Wyjście awaryjne
 1982: Jest mi lekko
 1983: Marynia
 1986: Rykowisko
 1988: Pięć minut przed gwizdkiem
 1988: Cesarskie cięcie
 1989: Goryl, czyli ostatnie zadanie...
 1994: Jest jak jest
 1999: Wrota Europy
 2004: Cudownie ocalony
 2007: Katyń - together with Andrzej Wajda
 2016: Afterimage

Awards and distinctions 
 1989 – Prix Italia in the category "Fiction" for radio dramas (screenplay) Z głębokości wód
 1996 – Prix Italia in the category "Fiction" for radio dramas (screenplay) Cyrk odjechał, lwy zostały
 2005 – Diamentowy Mikrofon [Diamond Microphone]

References

External links 
 Biographical data and filmography on the Filmweb site
 Biographical data and filmography on the Filmpolski site

Living people
Polish screenwriters
Polish journalists
Polish radio journalists
1930 births
Polish male writers
Recipient of the Meritorious Activist of Culture badge